Caluma Canton is a canton of Ecuador, located in the Bolívar Province.  Its population at the 2010 census was 13,129.

Demographics
Ethnic groups as of the Ecuadorian census of 2010:
Mestizo  91.8%
White  3.1%
Indigenous  2.3%
Afro-Ecuadorian  1.5%
Montubio  1.1%
Other  0.2%

Politics
Results of the Ecuadorian presidential elections of 2013 in Caluma Canton:
Lucio Gutiérrez (PSP)  33.6%
Rafael Correa (PAIS)  31.0%
Guillermo Lasso  (CREO)  21.3%
Mauricio Rodas (SUMA)  9.1%
Álvaro Noboa  (PRIAN)  3.0%
Alberto Acosta  (UPI)  0.8%
Norman Wray (Ruptura 25)  0.5%
Nelson Zavala  (PRE)  0.5%

References

Cantons of Bolívar Province (Ecuador)